Possum Kingdom Lake (popularly known as P.K.), is a reservoir on the Brazos River located primarily in Palo Pinto County Texas. It was the first water supply reservoir constructed in the Brazos River basin. It holds  of water with  available for water supply.

The lake is impounded by the Morris Sheppard Dam, which was a project of the Brazos River Authority and the Works Progress Administration. Construction was begun in 1936 and completed in 1941. The construction is unique with buttressed arched wings on either side of the nine spillway gates rather than the usual filled concrete. It has two 11,250 kilowatt generators which were used during peak demand periods that are no longer in use. Morris Sheppard was in 1938 one of Texas' United States Senators. The dam was named for him in honor of his efforts in obtaining funding for the project.

The lake is located where the Brazos River cuts through the Palo Pinto Hills. The canyon thus formed provided a favorable site for impoundment of the reservoir and accounts for the unusual depth of the lake and the resulting clarity of the water.

There are several stories about the origin of the name Possum Kingdom for this part of the Brazos River valley. The most accepted version attributes the name to Ike Sablosky who settled in the region in the early twentieth century. Sablosky was a businessman, a Russian Jewish immigrant who came to America at the age of 13.  He arrived in Mineral Wells, Texas from Indianapolis in 1905.  Sablosky was suffering from stomach trouble and believed he was dying.  Mineral Wells was then nationally famous as a health spa and Sablosky offered an employee of one of the spa hotels ten cents a day for ten days to be allowed to drink all of the mineral water he wanted.  The employee accepted and Sablosky claimed that within ten days his stomach problems were cured.

Sablosky then went into the fur and hide business, dealing in, among other things, possum pelts.  His best suppliers of these hunted in the canyon of the Brazos and Sablosky began greeting them by saying, "Here are the boys from the Possum Kingdom."  Sablosky went on to be a prominent businessman in Dallas.  Before his death he left millions of dollars to charity.

The lake is home to the famous Hell's Gate, a sheer break in the cliffs around the lake. The lake's name was the title of a popular 1990s song "Possum Kingdom" by The Toadies.

The lake is home to Possum Kingdom State Park, a  state park governed by the Texas Parks and Wildlife Department

The Possum Kingdom Lake area suffered major wildfires in 2011 during a severe drought, first in April with 160 homes destroyed and again in August–September with 39 homes and 9 recreational vehicles lost. The cause of the second 2011 fire was an electrical spark on the 101 Ranch. The first week of August 2012 brought more wildfires to the PK vicinity (between the dam & Graford) which were possibly ignited by lightning strikes amid the extremely drought-ridden countryside. Texas Governor Perry authorized the Texas military forces to assist in battling them. Several Chinook helicopters were assigned to the Palo Pinto county efforts.  The fires were brought under control over a period of days & nights.

The lake was originally at the level of the cliffs resort which caused the massive C-shaped ridges in the side walls of the shore.

References

External links

Possum Kingdom Online Community
PK lake 2011 FIRES webpage
April 2011 Fires as reported by Pondera Properties (PonderaPK) at Possum Kingdom Lake. This was the most comprehensive minute-by-minute report of days of fire coverage.  It was provided as a community service from a local business at Possum Kingdom Lake and the report itself (a/k/a the "fire blog") was followed by thousands of people and received media attention as a result.
Page 184, Tolbert of Texas: The Man and His Work - How Possum Kingdom got its name

Reservoirs in Texas
Brazos River Authority
Bodies of water of Palo Pinto County, Texas
Bodies of water of Stephens County, Texas
Bodies of water of Young County, Texas
Protected areas of Palo Pinto County, Texas
Protected areas of Stephens County, Texas
Protected areas of Young County, Texas
Works Progress Administration in Texas